Berkay Sefa Kara (born 27 March 1999) is a Turkish professional footballer who plays as a winger for Hekimoğlu Trabzon.

Professional career
On 21 July 2018, Kara signed his first professional contract with Trabzonspor, for a duration of 5 years. Kara made his professional debut for Trabzonspor in a 2-0 Süper Lig loss to Alanyaspor on 17 February 2019.

On 18 February it was announced, that Kara alongside four other young players had been promoted to the youth team again.

References

External links
 
 
 

1999 births
Living people
Sportspeople from Trabzon
Turkish footballers
Trabzonspor footballers
Süper Lig players
Association football wingers